Hans Hocke (born 16 April 1939) is an Austrian former fencer. He competed in the team sabre event at the 1960 Summer Olympics.

References

External links
 

1939 births
Living people
Austrian male sabre fencers
Olympic fencers of Austria
Fencers at the 1960 Summer Olympics
Fencers from Vienna